Karapet Pashayan (1864, Constantinople – 1915) was an Armenian physician, doctor and public activist.

He finished the Medical College of Constantinople in 1888, then worked as a doctor in Balu and Malatia provinces. In 1890 he was arrested for the support of Armenian fedayee groups, was sentenced to death but then released after the mediation of British consul's family. In 1895 he moved to Iran and became the Persian shah's doctor. For his efforts he was awarded by the khan title. In 1903-1906 Pashayan lived in Alexandria, Egypt, where he founded an Armenian school and a printing house. In 1908 after the Young Turk revolution he returned to Constantinople and was elected as a member of Ottoman parliament. In 1915 he was arrested among the other Armenian intellectuals and was sent to Ayash, where he was tortured and killed.

Pashayan is an author of literary and scientific works ("The Friends of the People", 1909).

Sources
The Doctors who became Victims of the Great Calamity, G. Karoyan, Boston, 1957, pp. 24–36
"Armenian Question", encyclopedia, ed. by acad. K. Khudaverdyan, Yerevan, 1996, p. 452

1864 births
Physicians from Istanbul
Ethnic Armenian physicians
People who died in the Armenian genocide
Armenians from the Ottoman Empire
Political people from the Ottoman Empire
1915 deaths